Robert van Ackeren (born 22 December 1946) is a German movie director, actor, producer, writer and cinematographer.

Filmography (director)
 Blondie's Number One (1971)
 The Sensuous Three (1972)
 The Last Word (1975)
 Belcanto oder Darf eine Nutte schluchzen? (1977)
  (1978, TV film)
  (1980)
  (1980)
 A Woman in Flames (1983)
  (1988)
 The True Story About Men and Women (1992)
  (2007)

External links
 imdb page
 http://www.deutsches-filmhaus.de/bio_reg/a_bio_regiss/ackeren_bio.htm (in German)

Living people
1946 births
Film people from Berlin